I Would Like to See You Again is the 57th album by American country singer Johnny Cash, released on Columbia Records in 1978. The title track peaked at #12 on the singles chart, while "There Ain't No Good Chain Gang" reached #2; the album itself peaked at #23. The album features a pair of duets with Waylon Jennings, one of which was the "There Ain't No Good Chain Gang" single; it was one of Cash's first collaborations with Jennings, and the two recorded songs together throughout the 1980s, including a separate album entitled Heroes. Cash and Jennings would also work together as The Highwaymen with Willie Nelson and Kris Kristofferson.

Track listing

Personnel
 Johnny Cash - vocals, guitar
 Waylon Jennings - vocals and electric guitar on "I Wish I Was Crazy Again" and "There Ain't No Good Chain Gang"
 Bob Wootton, Jerry Hensley, Jack Routh, Jimmy Capps, Jerry Shook, Pete Wade - guitar
 Marshall Grant, Gordon Payne - bass
 WS Holland - drums
 Ralph Mooney - steel guitar
 Larry McCoy, Cliff Robertson, Earl Poole Ball - piano
 Terry McMillan - harmonica
 Farrell Morris - percussion
 The Jordanaires - vocals
 John Carter Cash - question on "Who's Gene Autry?"

Additional personnel
Produced by Larry Butler
"I Wish I Was Crazy Again" and "There Ain't No Good Chain Gang" produced by Johnny Cash and Waylon Jennings
Engineers: Roger Tucker, Billy Sherrill
Recorded at Sound Spectrum Recording, Inc.
Mixes at Jack Clement Recording Studios
Johnny Cash cover photo by Alexander Agor
"Vision" photo of June Carter by Johnny Cash
Liner Notes by Larry Butler

Charts
Album - Billboard (United States)

Singles - Billboard (United States)

References

External links
 Luma Electronic entry on I Would Like to See You Again

Johnny Cash albums
1978 albums
Albums produced by Larry Butler (producer)
Columbia Records albums